Only a Woman Like You is an album by Michael Bolton, released in 2002 (see 2002 in music).

The album constituted a comeback for Bolton peaking at #36. Nevertheless, the album's success could by no way be compared to the success of his previous efforts. The album failed to gain any certification, selling about 400,000 copies in the US and less than 1 million globally.

Track listing
 "Dance with Me" (Bolton, Gary Haase, Billy Mann) – 3:30
 "I Wanna Hear You Say It" (Bolton, Mann, Rudy Pérez) – 3:13
 "Only a Woman Like You" (Bolton, Robert John "Mutt" Lange, Shania Twain, Max Martin, Rami) – 4:07
 "All That You Deserve" (Bolton, Andy Goldmark, Hex Hector) – 3:41
 "Love with My Eyes Closed" (Walter Afanasieff, Bolton, Mann) – 4:36
 "To Feel Again" (Bolton, Gary Burr, Desmond Child) – 3:19
 "The Center of My Heart" (Afanasieff, Bolton, Mann) – 4:49
 "This Is the Way" (Bolton, Goldmark, Robert John "Mutt" Lange) – 3:36
 "Simply" (Bolton, Goldmark, Mark Mueller) – 3:26
 "Slowly" (Bolton, Dan Hill, Richard Marx) – 4:38
 "I Surrender" (Bolton, Lange, Marx) – 4:01
 "Eternally" (Bolton, Marx) – 4:46
 "As" (Stevie Wonder) – 3:41
 "All for Love"* version of Marcos Vianna's song "Somente Por Amor" (Vianna – Portuguese Lyrics and music, Bolton – English Lyrics) – "O Clone" Original Soundtrack, Only released in Brazil.

Personnel 
 Michael Bolton – lead vocals, backing vocals (1, 2, 4, 5, 6, 8, 9), arrangements (1, 4, 5, 7-11)
 Gary Haase – all other instruments (1), additional programming (1), arrangements (1)
 Nemo – keyboard programming (2)
 Clay Perry – keyboard programming (2)
 Mark Portmann – keyboard programming (2)
 Henry Sommerdahl – grand piano (3)
 Chris DeStefano – keyboards (4, 8), bass (4, 8), drum programming (4, 8)
 Andy Goldmark – keyboards (4, 8, 9), bass (4, 8), drum programming (4, 8), arrangements (4, 8, 9)
 C.J. Vanston – keyboards (4, 8), bass (4, 8), drum programming (4, 8), keyboard programming (10, 12), arrangements (10, 12), programming (13)
 Walter Afanasieff – keyboards (5, 7), bass (5, 7), drum programming (5, 7), rhythm programming (5, 7), arrangements (5, 7)
 Robert Conley – programming (5, 7)
 Paul Santo – keyboards (6), programming (6), guitars (6), backing vocals (6)
 Brett Laurence – keyboards (9)
 Richard Marx – arrangements (10, 11, 12), backing vocals (10, 11, 12), keyboards (11), acoustic piano (12)
 John Blasucci – keyboard programming (11), drum programming (11)
 Richard Hilton – programming (13)
 Nataraj – programming (13)
 Paul Pimsler – electric guitar (1)
 Rudy Pérez – guitars (2), arrangements (2)
 Ebsjörn Öhrwall – acoustic guitar (3), electric guitar (3)
 Johan Lindström – steel guitar (3)
 Michael Thompson – acoustic guitar (4), electric guitar (4, 10), guitars (8, 11, 12)
 Michael Landau – electric guitar (5)
 Ike Woods – guitars (6)
 Tomas Lindberg – bass (3)
 Rico Suarez – bass (6)
 Nathan East – bass (9)
 Todd Sucherman – drums (10)
 Rolando Morales-Matos – percussion (1)
 D. Lopez – percussion (5)
 Amir Sosi – tabla (8)
 Jan Bengtsson – flute (3)
 Billy Mann – arrangements (1, 2)
 Henrik Janson – string arrangements (3)
 Ulf Janson – string arrangements (3)
 Snyko – strings (3)
 Paul Buckmaster – string arrangements (9)
 Nikki Richards – backing vocals (1)
 Mutt Lange – backing vocals (3)
 Marc Nelson – backing vocals (4, 8, 9)
 Skyler Jett – backing vocals (5, 7)
 Conesha Owens – backing vocals (5, 7)
 Claytoven Richardson – backing vocals (5, 7)
 Gene Miller – backing vocals (10, 11)

Production 
 Louis Levin – executive producer
 Michael Bolton – executive producer, producer (1, 2, 5-13)
 Gary Haase – producer (1)
 Billy Mann – producer (1, 2)
 Rudy Pérez – producer (2)
 Mutt Lange – producer (3)
 Max Martin – producer (3)
 Rami Yacoub – producer (3)
 Andy Goldmark – producer (4, 8, 9)
 Walter Afanasieff – producer (5, 7)
 Desmond Child – producer (6)
 Richard Marx – producer (10, 11, 12)
 Nile Rodgers – producer (13)
 Nataraj – co-producer (13)
 Jackie Murphy – art direction, design 
 Nigel Parry – photography

Technical 
 Chaz Harper – mastering 
 Gary Haase – recording (1)
 Steve Milo – recording (1, 4-10, 12, 13), vocal recording (11)
 Joel Numa – recording (2)
 Felipe Tichauer – recording (2)
 Bruce Weedon – recording (2), mixing (2)
 Robert Wellorfors – recording (3)
 Hakon Wollgard – recording (3)
 Kevin Churko – vocal engineer (3), vocal editing (3)
 David Cole – recording (4, 8-13), mixing (8, 10-13)
 Chris DeStefano – recording (4, 8, 9)
 Frank Wolf – recording (4, 8, 9)
 Greg Bieck – recording (5, 7)
 David Gleeson – recording (5, 7)
 David Reitzas – recording (5, 7-10, 12)
 Jules Gondar – recording (6)
 Craig Lozowick – recording (6)
 Brett Laurence – recording (9)
 Matt Prock – recording (12)
 Richard Hilton – recording (13)
 Andy Zulla – mixing (1, 2)
 Max Martin – mixing (3)
 Rami Yacoub – mixing (3)
 Mick Guzauski – mixing (4, 5, 7, 9)
 Carlos Alvarez – mixing (6)
 Simon Simantob – recording assistant (2)
 Steve Genewick – recording assistant (4, 8)
 Jimmy Hoyson – recording assistant (4, 8, 12)
 Jason Rankins – recording assistant (4)
 German Villacorta – recording assistant (4, 8)
 Mike Zainer – recording assistant (4)
 Pete Krawiec – recording assistant (5, 7)
 Nicholas Marshall – recording assistant (5, 7, 8, 10, 12)
 Nick Thomas – recording assistant (5, 7)
 Conrad Golding – recording assistant (6)
 Dan Gomez – recording assistant (6)
 Greg Landon – recording assistant (6)
 Nathan Malki – recording assistant (6)
 Marcelo Marulanda – recording assistant (6)
 Jay Goin – recording assistant (8, 10, 12)
 John Hendrickson – recording assistant (8)
 Matt Marrin – recording assistant (9)
 Grayson Sumby – recording assistant (12)
 Alan Ford – recording assistant (13)
 Darrell Herbert – recording assistant (13)
 Tom Bender – mix assistant (4, 5, 7, 9)
 Chris Trevett – additional post mixing (9)

Studios
 Recorded at Passion Studios and Le Crib Studios (Westport, CT); Renegade Studios (Chicago, IL); The Gentlemen's Club (Miami Beach, FL); Emerald Sound Studio and Ocean Way Nashville (Nashville, TN); Headman Sound (New York, NY); Final Approach (Encino, CA); The Enterprise (Burbank, CA); Conway Studios, Ocean Way Recording, Henson Recording Studios and Capitol Studios (Hollywood, CA); The Treehouse (North Hollywood, CA); Record Plant, Westlake Audio and The Village Recorder(Los Angeles, CA); Wallyworld; Dig's Spot; Polar Studios and Maritone Studios (Stockholm, Sweden).
 Mixed at Sound Decision (New York, NY) and Playroom Studios (Miami, FL).
 Mastered at Battery Mastering Studios (New York, NY).

References

Michael Bolton albums
2002 albums
Albums produced by Max Martin
Albums produced by Walter Afanasieff
Albums produced by Desmond Child
Albums produced by Rami Yacoub
Albums produced by Robert John "Mutt" Lange
Albums produced by Richard Marx
Jive Records albums